"Eyes Don't Lie" is a song by Australian singer Tones and I. It was released on 17 March 2022 through Bad Batch Records, distributed by Sony Music in Australia and New Zealand and globally by Elektra Records as the lead single from her forthcoming second studio album.

Tones and I said, "'Eyes Don't Lie' is written about a large loss of someone/something, resenting the person/feeling you get and realising it was a toxic person/feeling all along."

Charts

References

2022 singles
2021 songs
Tones and I songs
Songs written by Tones and I